The grey-throated martin or Asian plain martin (Riparia chinensis) is a small passerine bird in the swallow family.

The grey-throated martin is found in open habitats such as farmland, grassland and savannah, usually near water. It is found from Tajikistan,  Afghanistan and Indian subcontinent to southern China, Taiwan, and the northern Philippines. It was formerly considered a subspecies of the plain martin, since renamed the brown-throated martin.

References

Rasmussen, P.C., and J.C. Anderton (2005). Birds of South Asia. The Ripley Guide. Volume 2: attributes and status. Smithsonian Institution and Lynx Edicions, Washington D.C. and Barcelona.

grey-throated martin
Birds of Central Asia
Birds of South Asia
Birds of Southeast Asia
Birds of Taiwan
Birds of the Philippines
grey-throated martin
grey-throated martin